Saddle  Hill is a low lying mountain in eastern Aberdeenshire, Scotland within the Mounth Range of the Grampian Mountains. This hill is immediately north of the Roman camp of Raedykes.
 From Saddle Hill there are expansive views to the North Sea facing east and the valley of the Burn of Monboys to the east and southeast.

Geology and hydrology

Prehistory
Neolithic traces of civilisation appear on the southwest flanks of the lower slopes of Saddle Hill in the form of cairns and standing stones.

Wind farm proposal
Renewable Energy Resources has an application pending before the Aberdeenshire Council to create a windfarm for electrical power generation using Saddle Hill, Curlethney Hill, Meikle Carewe Hill (the two latter hills situated slightly to the west of Saddle Hill to install 12 wind turbines.  Each turbine would reach a height of 70 metres above grade level, and the entire complex could generate enough power to supply the equivalent of 5000 homes. Environmental concerns over the proposal include noise pollution, visual impact and ecological disturbance.

See also
Fetteresso Castle
Megray Hill

References

Mountains and hills of Aberdeenshire